Belinda Peregrín is a Spanish singer and actress Mexican naturalized. Her music career started in 2000 when she contributed vocals to the soundtrack albums for the Mexican telenovela, Amigos x siempre, in which she also starred. In 2003 Belinda Peregrin released her debut album Belinda (Belinda Peregrín album). Belinda Peregrin has recorded songs for four studio albums, several soundtracks and has collaborated with other artists for duets and featured songs on their respective albums and charity singles.

Songs

References

External links
Belinda discography on AllMusic

 
Belinda
Mexican music-related lists